St Augustine's Abbey or Chilworth Abbey, formerly Chilworth Friary, is a Roman Catholic Benedictine abbey in Chilworth, Surrey. The building, which is Grade II listed, was designed by Frederick Walters and was built in 1892. It was formerly a Franciscan friary and a novitiate for the order. The abbey church is open to the public 365 days a year.

Friary

Construction
Construction of the friary started in 1890 and it was designed by the architect Frederick Walters, who also designed the nearby St. John's Seminary in Wonersh. It was financed by a £7,000 bequest from Mary Anne Alliott who was the aunt of the founder of the friary, Fr Arthur Wells. On 18 June 1892 the friary and church was dedicated and consecrated by the Bishop of Southwark. The friary was built to serve as a novitiate for the Franciscans in Britain.

Developments
In the centre of the Cloister, there is a large yew tree which was planted from a cutting taken from the Ancient Yew at the Friary at Muckross Abbey in Killarney, Ireland which is reputed to date from the foundation of that Abbey in 1430AD. In 1915, an organ, built by Lewis & Co was installed. It was paid for by John Courage of Derryswood, Wonersh (owner of both Lewis & Co and Courage Brewery) and was done with permission from the architect. The same year, Albert Ketèlbey wrote his light classical music piece, In a Monastery Garden, having visited the friary.

Parish
In 1945, the parish of Holy Ghost Church was entrusted to the friary. It expanded and the friary also served a Mass centre in Gomshall, Our Lady of the Angels.

Abbey
In 2011, it was announced that the friars would leave Chilworth. The friars were distributed amongst the other Franciscan houses in Britain and the parish church of the Holy Ghost was closed. That year, St Augustine's Abbey in Ramsgate also closed and the Benedictine monks from the Order of St Benedict, of the Subiaco Cassinese Congregation, looked for a smaller property to move into. When Chilworth Friary became available, they agreed to move to the area and it became St Augustine's Abbey.

The monastic community follows the Rule of St Benedict under the guidance of an Abbot, centred on the Divine Office and Mass prayed daily in the Abbey Church, often in a mix of Latin and English including Gregorian Chant. The community currently numbers eight monks and one postulant. There are a number of lay oblates. The monks run a guest house and offer a programme of retreats, monastic vocation visits, study days, meditation sessions and healing days. They also make and sell skin creams and furniture polish made from bees wax. St Augustine's Abbey, Chilworth compiles 'The Book of Saints, A Comprehensive Biographical Dictionary' by Dom Basil Watkins OSB.

St Augustine's Abbey is not a parish church but the abbey church is open to the public to attend services every day of the year, along with other regular events in the church calendar.

Gallery

Exterior

Interior

See also
 Franciscan
 List of places of worship in Waverley (borough)
 St Augustine's Abbey, Ramsgate
 Subiaco Cassinese Congregation

References

External links

 St Augustine's Abbey site

Monasteries in Surrey
Benedictine monasteries in England
1892 establishments in England
Franciscan monasteries in England
Grade II listed churches in Surrey
Roman Catholic churches in Surrey
Grade II listed Roman Catholic churches in England
Roman Catholic churches completed in 1892
Frederick Walters buildings
19th-century Roman Catholic church buildings in the United Kingdom